Okeho is a town located in Kajola Oyo State South West Nigeria.  It is the headquarters of Kajola Local Government.

Location 
It is a valley town and, a developing community in the Òkè Ógùn area of Oyo State.  It is surrounded by mountains and valleys and surrounded by the towns Ilero, Ilua,Ayetoro-oke, Isemi ile, Iwere-oke, and Ilaji-oke. A valley-town is domiciled on a plateau and has a beautiful, breathtaking, lovely landscape. It is promoted as a tourist attraction. Its panoramic view is said to be glorious.

History 
Okeho was previously up in the hills and mountains, but it relocated to the valley due to raids from enemies.  Okeho is an amalgamation of eleven villages who voluntarily decided to come together for protection and self-survival.

The villages that came together are Isia, Olele, Isemi, Imoba, Gbonje, Oke-Ogun, Ogan, Bode, Pamo, Alubo and Ijo.

The Baale of Ijo, the head of that settlement, was the initiator of this process and pursued it diligently as he kept inviting the other parties. This singular act of selflessness made its mark as the other leaders, who conceded the overall leadership of the new settlement.

Okeho celebrated its centenary return from the old settlement to present one in 2017.

The paramount ruler is called Onjo of Okeho, and the present one is His Royal Majesty, Oba Rafiu Osuolale Mustapha, Adeitan II. There have been eighteen Onjos till present.

People 

The people of Okeho are of the Yoruba ethnic group.  The diversity in the community is acknowledged by their distinct variation of Yoruba, called Onko and depicted in the video as an indigenous man who speaks the dialect.

Economy 
The indigenes are predominantly farmers and traders. Okeho is often referred to as the food basket of Oyo State. In Oheko's economy, people contribute in a single purse for the advancement of the community by sponsorship of the individuals who later pay it forward.

This system ingrained by the promotion of integrity and trust, a cultural value commonly found in the ethnic race of Yoruba's referred to as Omoluwabi. This extended to commerce and marketplaces where the traders had market delegates represent them in whom they had confidence in their abilities.

References 

Local Government Areas in Oyo State
Cities in Yorubaland
Cities in Nigeria